Edno Roberto Cunha (born May 31, 1983 in Lages), or simply Edno, is a Brazilian footballer who plays for Brasiliense as an attacking midfielder or a second striker.

Biography
Edno was signed by Corinthians on 15 September 2009 for R$3,558,000  for 50% economic rights., which Portuguesa received R$3 million and retained 40% economic rights. In 2012, he was sold from Corinthians and Portuguesa for US$1.5 million and $1.2 million respectively

Honours

Club
Wisła Kraków
Ekstraklasa: 2003–04

Botafogo
 Campeonato Carioca: 2010

Corinthians
Campeonato Brasileiro Série A: 2011

Portuguesa
Campeonato Brasileiro Série B: 2011

 América Mineiro
 Campeonato Brasileiro Série B: 2017

References

External links
CBF  

globoesporte 
furacao 

1983 births
Living people
People from Lages
Brazilian footballers
Brazil under-20 international footballers
Campeonato Brasileiro Série A players
Campeonato Brasileiro Série B players
J1 League players
Ekstraklasa players
Liga MX players
Czech First League players
Primeira Liga players
Avaí FC players
Cruzeiro Esporte Clube players
Figueirense FC players
Esporte Clube Novo Hamburgo players
Club Athletico Paranaense players
Esporte Clube Noroeste players
Associação Portuguesa de Desportos players
Sport Club Corinthians Paulista players
Botafogo de Futebol e Regatas players
Associação Atlética Ponte Preta players
Esporte Clube Vitória players
ABC Futebol Clube players
Esporte Clube São Bento players
PSV Eindhoven players
FC Viktoria Plzeň players
Wisła Kraków players
Tigres UANL footballers
Cerezo Osaka players
Clube do Remo players
América Futebol Clube (MG) players
Moreirense F.C. players
Clube Atlético Tubarão players
Brasiliense Futebol Clube players
Brazilian expatriate footballers
Expatriate footballers in the Czech Republic
Expatriate footballers in Japan
Expatriate footballers in the Netherlands
Expatriate footballers in Mexico
Expatriate footballers in Poland
Expatriate footballers in Portugal
Brazilian expatriate sportspeople in Poland
Association football forwards
Association football midfielders
Sportspeople from Santa Catarina (state)